Khondoker Abdul Majid High School (K.A.M High School) was established in 1969. It is situated in Ullahpara Upazila of Sirajganj District in the Division of Rajshahi, Bangladesh. It is beside the railway station and 3 kilometers away from Ullapara PS office. The builder is Khondokar Abdul Mojid, and the headmaster is Nikhil Chandra Ghosh.

Academic qualification
The students attend the Junior Scholarship Examination and won the scholarship. They attend the public examination- S.S.C and achieve good results.

Administration
The school's academic is divided into six classes. A committee from the guardian of the students helps the headmaster with administration.

Cultural activities
Some functions are held in the school, including Milad Mahfil (a religious function) and Bidai Anusthab.

Sports and scouting
The students join in scouting with a teacher's help. There is an annual sports competition (Barshik Kria Protijogita).

References

High schools in Bangladesh
Educational institutions established in 1969
1969 establishments in East Pakistan